Pine Flat Lake is an artificial lake or reservoir in the Sierra Nevada foothills of eastern Fresno County, California on the western north-south border to the Sierra- and Sequoia National Forests, about  east of Fresno. The lake is managed by the U.S. Army Corps of Engineers (USACE) and is open to boaters, campers & hikers.

Although it was primarily designed for flood control, the project also provides for irrigation and groundwater recharge, recreation, and with the completion in 1984 of the Jeff L. Taylor Pine Flat Power Plant, generation of 165 Megawatts hydroelectric power.

Recreation and Wildlife

The lake is a popular regional tourist destination for water-based recreation. The U.S. Army Corps of Engineers, Sacramento District manages the land around the lake and offers several recreation areas and wildlife management areas. The following recreation and wildlife areas help lake visitors experience Pine Flat Lake:

Deer Creek Recreation Area and Pine Flat Lake Marina (the marina is privately operated under an agreement with USACE).
Island Park Recreation Area and Campground
Lakeview Recreation Area
Edison Point Wildlife Area (open to hunting and wildlife viewing)
Trimmer Springs Recreation Area and Campground
Sycamore Creek Wildlife Area (open to hunting and wildlife viewing)
Kirch Flat Recreation Area and Campground (managed by Sierra National Forest)

The fisheries are managed and stocked by the California Department of Fish and Wildlife, common fish species include: large and smallmouth bass, spotted bass, rainbow trout, king (chinook) and kokanee salmon, catfish, crappie and bluegill. Anglers can fish for native rainbow trout in the upper Kings River, which is a special management area that encourages natural reproduction of wild trout without the planting of domestic stock. Anglers must have a valid state fishing license and comply with all California Department of Fish and Wildlife rules & regulations.

Hunting is permitted outside of developed recreation areas with bow and arrow or shotgun only.

Enforcement of rules and regulations are performed by USACE Park Rangers, Game Wardens with the California Department of Fish and Wildlife, and deputies of the Fresno County Sheriff's Department.

See also
U.S. Army Corps of Engineers
Sierra National Forest
Sequoia National Forest
Kings Canyon National Park
List of dams and reservoirs in California
List of lakes in California
List of largest reservoirs in the United States
List of largest reservoirs of California

References

External links 
 
U.S. Army Corps of Engineers, Pine Flat Lake
Pine Flat Lake Recreation - Recreation.gov, camping reservations and information
Sierra National Forest
Sequoia National Forest

Reservoirs in Fresno County, California
Kings River (California)
Lakes of the Sierra Nevada (United States)
Reservoirs in Northern California